The Madonna of Kyiv is a symbolic image of a woman nursing a child who took refuge in the Kyiv Metro to protect herself from an attack during the bombing of the Ukrainian capital city of Kyiv in 2022 by the Armed Forces of the Russian Federation. The photo taken by journalist András Földes has become popular on the Internet. It has become an illustration of both a humanitarian crisis and an unjust war. The image was the inspiration for an icon displayed in a Catholic church in Mugnano di Napoli, Italy, which became an artistic symbol of resistance and hope.

History

In the first days of Russia's war in Ukraine, the image of 27-year-old Tetyana Blizniak breastfeeding her three-month-old daughter Marichka, who took refuge in the tunnels of the Kyiv subway to protect herself from the attack during the bombing of the city of Kiev by the Armed Forces of the Russian Federation, caught the attention of Hungarian journalist András Földes, and he spontaneously filmed it. The woman took refuge in the subway with her husband and child from February 25, 2022. Although they were supposed to be evacuated on February 26, they could not get out of the tunnel they were sheltering in because of the fighting.
The photo went viral and was even shared by the Vatican's official website. Ukrainian artist Marina Solomennykova from Dnipro was among those who saw it. She used the iconic image of a woman as inspiration for his portrait of Mary nursing her baby. In the picture, a Ukrainian woman's headdress is used as a veil of Mary, and her head is depicted in front of a subway map. On March 5, 2020, the artist posted the portrait he created on the Internet.

At the request of the Jesuit priest Vyacheslav Okun, a canvas copy of the portrait "Madonna from the Metro" was sent to Italy to be kept in the place where the priest will serve. On Holy Thursday, the Archbishop of Naples consecrated the painting as an object of worship. The icon was displayed in the Church of the Sacred Heart of Jesus, nicknamed "Madonna of Kyiv", located in the commune of Munyano di Napoli. The icon was consecrated by Pope Francis on March 25, 2022.

Tetyana Blizniak later took refuge in Lviv.

Significance 
The image has become both an illustration of humanitarian crisis and unjust war, and a symbol of hope and silent resistance of Ukrainians. The portrait, in turn, as the mother of Jesus of Nazareth, who took refuge from the danger of Herod the Great is today considered a symbol of the modern Mary who takes refuge from the violence of war and nurses her baby like him. The Kyiv Virgin is also notable for its role in Ukrainian history and national identity. During the Soviet era, the icon was used as a symbol of Ukrainian nationalism and resistance to Soviet domination. Today, it is considered a cultural treasure and a symbol of Ukrainian identity and heritage.

References 

Culture in Kyiv
2022 Russian invasion of Ukraine in popular culture